Manius Acilius Glabrio may refer to:

 Manius Acilius Glabrio (consul 191 BC), Roman senator
 Manius Acilius Glabrio (consul 154 BC), Roman senator
 Manius Acilius Glabrio (consul 67 BC), Roman senator
 Manius Acilius Glabrio (consul 91), Roman senator executed by the emperor Domitian
 Manius Acilius Glabrio Gnaeus Cornelius Severus (119 – after 177), Roman senator, consul in 152
 Manius Acilius Glabrio (consul 186), Roman senator

See also